is a passenger railway station in the village of Tsumagoi, Gunma Prefecture, Japan, operated by East Japan Railway Company (JR East). This station is 840.4 meters AMSL.

Lines
Ōmae Station is a terminal station of the Agatsuma Line, and is located 55.3 rail kilometers from the opposing terminus of the line at Shibukawa Station.

Station layout
The station consists of a single dead-headed side platform. The station is unattended.

History
Ōmae Station was opened on 7 March 1971. The station was absorbed into the JR East network upon the privatization of the Japanese National Railways (JNR) on 1 April 1987.

Surrounding area
 
Agatsuma River

See also
 List of railway stations in Japan

External links

 JR East Station information 

Railway stations in Gunma Prefecture
Agatsuma Line
Stations of East Japan Railway Company
Railway stations in Japan opened in 1971
Tsumagoi, Gunma